Qiyunia is a monotypic genus of Asian cribellate araneomorph spiders in the family Dictynidae containing the single species, Qiyunia lehtineni. It was first described by D. X. Song & Y. J. Xu in 1989, and has only been found in China and in Japan.

References

Dictynidae
Monotypic Araneomorphae genera
Spiders of Asia